Naseem Hameed (born 1 May 1988) is a Pakistani track and field athlete, who became the fastest woman in South Asia  when she won a gold medal in the 100 metres at the 2010 South Asian Games in Dhaka.

Career
Naseem started her career as an athlete from her school. She participated in various sports activities at school and college levels. During her time in college, she was noticed by Army coaches and was allowed to practice in Army grounds near Korangi. She won various local events after this and was then picked by Pakistan Railways as an athlete. Naseem consistent performance earned her a place to represent Pakistan in 2010 SAF Games in Dhaka where she won the Coveted Gold in 100 Meters clocking 11.81 gaining the title of Fastest Women in South Asia and emerge as the queen of the track.

On February 12, 2010, President of Pakistan Asif Ali Zardari appointed Naseem as Ambassador of Sports in recognition of her success at the SAF Games. In July, 2010 Pakistan's leading Mobile operator Mobilink has added Naseem to its panel of brand ambassadors. Bilal Munir Sheikh, Vice President of Mobilink Pakistan said on the ceremony of unveiling the song based on Hameed’s struggle and accomplishments and commemorating those who helped her achieve her goals that:

“Mobilink Jazz believes strongly in the bonds we create and the objective of this tribute is to encourage all those who dream to reach out their loved ones for support so they can achieve what they want to, and much more. Naseem is a hero we all needed and we hope that through the Jazz platform she will inspire many more. We are indeed very proud and privileged to have her as our Brand Ambassador.”

Biopic 
A telefilm “Bhaag Amina Bhaag” based upon a real and untold life story of Naseem Hameed on-aired on Geo TV. The telefilm was a commendable effort to give tribute to great female Pakistani athlete. The drama was directed by Yasir Nawaz and produced by Sameena Humayun Saeed. The lead role of Naseem Hameed was played by Aamina Sheikh. The film draws out attention to an aspiration message of a girl who wants to live her dreams and aspirations despite the difficult situation she has to go through to get them, a story which is deeply rooted in our society.

References

External links
 

1988 births
Living people
Pakistani female sprinters
Sportspeople from Karachi
Recipients of the Pride of Performance
South Asian Games gold medalists for Pakistan
South Asian Games medalists in athletics